Dirt Track Date is an album by Southern Culture on the Skids, released in 1995. It was the band's first album for DGC Records. The band attracted some attention with the release of the song "Camel Walk".

Production
The album was produced by Mark Williams, and was recorded at Reflection Studios, in Charlotte, North Carolina.

Critical reception
Trouser Press wrote: "Lacking the ebullient sense of reckless fun that fueled their best work, Dirt Track Date runs on nothing but the fumes of shtick." No Depression called the album "one hell of a brainless good time," but lamented the relative lack of Mary Huff vocals. The Los Angeles Times described it as "reeling rockabilly and corny country."

Track listing
All songs were written by Rick Miller, except "Nitty Gritty" by Lincoln Chase, and arranged by the band.
 "Voodoo Cadillac" - 4:40
 "Soul City" - 2:36
 "Greenback Fly" - 3:47
 "Skullbucket" - 2:40
 "Camel Walk" - 2:37
 "White Trash" - 2:03
 "Firefly" - 3:24
 "Make Mayan a Hawaiian" - 2:24
 "Fried Chicken and Gasoline" - 4:17
 "Nitty Gritty" - 2:30
 "8 Piece Box" - 4:02
 "Galley Slave" - 3:00
 "Whole Lotta Things" - 2:29
 "Dirt Track Date" - 8:39

Personnel 

David Hartman – drums, maracas, vocals
Mary Huff – organ, bass, vocals, handclapping
Michael Lipton – steel guitar
Rick Miller – guitar, composer, tambourine, vocals
Soul City Singers – vocals (background)
Southern Culture on the Skids – producer
Mark Williams – producer

References 

Southern Culture on the Skids albums
1995 albums
Geffen Records albums